Gandrališkės is a new district in Klaipėda, Lithuania. It is the location of the tallest residential building in the Baltic States, Pilsotas. There are plans to build a 43-story 170m-high Kuršas building in the near future.

See also
Pilsotas
Vilnius TV Tower
Tallest buildings in Lithuania

Neighbourhoods of Klaipėda